Mesquite Tower is a free-standing lattice tower located in Mesquite, Texas, United States, that is  tall. It is the tallest structure in the city and a well known local landmark. The tower features a unique design called a Landmark or Adelphon tower  and was built in 1990. It stands between West Mesquite High School and Memorial Stadium. Owned by the Mesquite Independent School District, it is a 61,000 watt radio tower used by the radio station KEOM which is operated by the school district.

See also
 List of towers

References

External links
 KEOM 88.5
 
 "Tower Site" Does Dallas, part II – discusses Mesquite Tower, among others in the DFW area

Towers in Texas
Buildings and structures in Dallas County, Texas